Noelle Vial (December 25, 1959 – January 20, 2003) was an Irish poet from County Donegal, Ireland.  She was the recipient of the Hennessy Literary Award for best emerging poet in 1994. Her debut poetry collection, Promiscuous Winds, was published in 1995.

Early life
Noelle Sharkey was born on 25 December 1959 in Killybegs, County Donegal, Ireland. Her parents were Paddy and Peggy Sharkey. 
While in school, Sharkey was the recipient of a Pushkin prize for poetry. The Pushkin Prizes were established in 1987 by Sacha Hamilton, Duchess of Abercorn, to commemorate the 150th anniversary of the death of her ancestor, Alexander Pushkin. The poetry prize was awarded annually to school aged children.

Career
Vial wrote poetry and taught creative writing at St Catherine's Vocational School. She was a founding member of the Killybegs writers group. Her first poetry collection, Promiscuous Winds was published in the United States in 1995 by Story Line Press. 
Vial was the recipient of the Hennessy Literary Award for best emerging poet in 1994.

Vial died at her home on 19 January 2003. A number of poems were found among her papers after her death; Vial had been under contract for a new collection of poetry to be published in the U.S. Fourteen years later, the book of poems, The Ungrateful Princess, edited by writer, Liam McGinley, and Vial's son, Derek Vial, was published in 2017.

In 2013, The Donegal Bay and Blue Stacks Festival, supported by The Arts Council and Creative Ireland, established an annual poetry bursary for emerging poets in memory of Vial. The bursary, named the Noelle Vial Tyrone Guthrie Centre Poetry Bursary, provides a week-long stay at the Tyrone Guthrie Centre at Newbliss, County Monaghan

Selected publications

References

1959 births
2003 deaths
Irish poets
Irish women poets
People from County Donegal
20th-century poets
20th-century Irish women writers